Pogonomyrmex colei is a species of ant in the subfamily Myrmicinae. It is native to the United States.

References

External links

colei
Endemic fauna of the United States
Insects of the United States
Hymenoptera of North America
Insects described in 1982
Taxonomy articles created by Polbot
Slave-making ants